Samur–Absheron channel is an irrigation channel in Azerbaijan flowing from Russia-Azerbaijan border to the Jeyranbatan reservoir.

Overview
Samur–Absheron channel starts near the Qaleysuvar Mountain in Khachmaz Rayon and flows to the south until it discharges into the Jeyranbatan reservoir. The second  section starts from Ataçay and ends at Jeyranbatan reservoir. Its construction was completed in 1956. Until 1953, the channel was named Joseph Stalin channel.
Samur–Absheron channel has over 350 hydro-technical structures and two pumping stations handling the flow of water. One of them is located in
Hacı Zeynalabdin settlement near Sumgayit. It was previously called "Nasosny" (translated as "pumping station" in Russian language).
The channel also provides drinking water to Baku and Sumgayit.

See also
Rivers and lakes in Azerbaijan

References

Rivers of Azerbaijan
Qusar District
Khachmaz District
Shabran District
Absheron District